To Whom It May Concern is the tenth album by the Bee Gees. Released in October 1972, it is the follow-up to, and continues the melancholic and personal sound of its predecessor, Trafalgar. The album was recognised as "a farewell to the old Bee Gees" as the album marked the end of an era for the group in several ways: it was their last album to be recorded solely at IBC Studios, in London, their last with conductor and arranger Bill Shepherd, who had guided them since 1967, and their last under their first contract with Robert Stigwood. Some of the songs were old ones finished or rewritten for the occasion (in the case of "I Can Bring Love").

Background and recording
After touring in 1971 to promote their previous album, Trafalgar, the Bee Gees worked quickly to complete another album. They recorded the song "Paper Mache, Cabbages and Kings" on 3 January 1972 which was the last song recorded with the Australian drummer Geoff Bridgford. He left the group before their tour of East Asia and was replaced on tour by Chris Karan. Recording resumed in April 1972 with a Robin song called "Never Been Alone" and a song Barry did on his fan club recording from 1971 called "I Can Bring Love". The drummer on the April sessions was a veteran session player, Clem Cattini. The first song recorded for this album was "You Know It's For You", a song written and performed by Maurice Gibb, on which he played guitar, bass, keyboard and mellotron. Karan did not participate with the Bee Gees on studio as Clem Cattini recalls:

The album was primarily recorded between June 1971 and April 1972 (except for "We Lost the Road", recorded in January 1971 during the Trafalgar sessions). The Bee Gees saved a non-album single, "My World", from the sessions which was released in January 1972, becoming a UK/US Top 20 hit. Shepherd's arrangements are relatively toned down and the background vocals sometimes seem to take the place of what could have been string sections.

Release and reception

The album was released in November 1972. Stephen Holden's contemporary review in Rolling Stone commented that he felt the Bee Gees occupied "a very limited territory of pop music", dealing mainly in ballads of "momentary pathos", and that the album was "headphone mood music that makes no demands beyond a superficial emotional surrender to its perfumed atmosphere of pink frosting and glitter", and that the Gibbs vocal style had developed to the point where "they sound more like reed instruments than singers". Bruce Eder in a retrospective review for AllMusic feels the album makes for pleasant and satisfying listening, and is "one of their most fully realized works".
 
To Whom It May Concern only reached No. 35 in the US; it was their third consecutive studio album to fail to appear in the UK album charts. It performed better in other European countries. In Spain reached No. 6. The subsequent single "Alive" was a modest sized hit in the US, reaching the Top 40, and a major hit in Australia, reaching No. 4. In the 2010 documentary In Our Own Time, Maurice was shown explaining (in archival footage) that by 1972 they didn't really know who their audience was, hence the title To Whom It May Concern. The original album cover was a gatefold with pictures of  business associates and family members on a drawing of the Bee Gees and a band. The band shows Barry, Robin and Maurice Gibb (Maurice is playing Rickenbacker 4001) Alan Kendall and tour-only drummer Chris Karan, with Bill Shepherd conducting the orchestra.

"Paper Mache, Cabbages and Kings" entered the Danish charts in the first week of 1973 and stayed in the charts for 5 weeks, peaking at #8.

Track listing

Alternate track listing
Some publicity material featured an alternate trackorder although no commercial release of it exists.
Side one
"Alive" / "I Can Bring Love" / "Bad Bad Dreams" / "I Held a Party" / "Sea of Smiling Faces" / "Road to Alaska" / "Run to Me"
Side two
"Paper Mache, Cabbages and Kings" / "We Lost the Road" / "You Know It's For You" / "Never Been Alone" / "Please Don't Turn Out the Lights" / "Sweet Song of Summer"

Personnel
Bee Gees
 Barry Gibb – lead, harmony and backing vocals, rhythm guitar
 Robin Gibb – lead, harmony and backing vocals
 Maurice Gibb – harmony and backing vocals, bass guitar, rhythm guitar, piano, Hammond organ, Mellotron, harpsichord, mandolin, Moog synthesizer on #6 (side 2), lead vocals on #3 (side 2)
 Geoff Bridgford – drums on #2, 4 (side 1) and #4 (side 2)

Additional musicians and production staff
 Alan Kendall – rhythm guitar; lead guitar on #2, 5 (side 2)
 Clem Cattini – drums (except #2, 4 (side 1) and #4 (side 2))
 Bill Shepherd – orchestral arrangement
 Mike Claydon, Damon Lyon-Shaw, Richard Manwaring, Andy Knight – engineer
 Mike Vickers – synthesizer engineer (on #6 (side 2))

Charts

References

Bee Gees albums
1972 albums
Polydor Records albums
Atco Records albums
Albums produced by Barry Gibb
Albums produced by Robin Gibb
Albums produced by Maurice Gibb
Albums produced by Robert Stigwood
Albums recorded at IBC Studios
Soft rock albums by English artists